Herrenhaus (German, literally "House of Lords") may refer to:

 a manor house or mansion,
 the Prussian House of Lords,
 Österreichisches Herrenhaus, see House of Lords (Austria).

See also
House of Lords (disambiguation)